Victoria Pattison (born 16 November 1987) is a British television personality, media personality and author. She is best known for appearing in the MTV shows Geordie Shore from 2011 until 2014, Ex on the Beach in 2014 and 2015 and her own show Judge Geordie in 2015.

Pattison won the fifteenth series of I'm a Celebrity...Get Me Out of Here! (UK) in December 2015 and became a permanent member on the panel of the ITV daytime chat show Loose Women in January 2016. She was also a team captain on the Channel 5 panel show It's Not Me, It's You and co-presented I'm a Celebrity: Extra Camp in 2016.

Early life
Before Geordie Shore, Pattison enjoyed drama in school. She had various jobs, including working on the door of some of Newcastle's nightclubs and also in telesales. 
Pattison holds a degree in drama from Liverpool John Moores University.

Media career

Geordie Shore

Pattison appeared in the popular MTV show Geordie Shore, from 2011 to 2014 in the first series of the show, she had a short relationship with fellow co-star Jay Gardner. After her rise to fame on the show, she was featured on the front cover of the magazine Loaded in October 2011 alongside The Only Way Is Essex star Jess Wright and Made in Chelsea star Binky Felstead. Pattison has also featured in the magazine Nuts with fellow Geordie Shore star Holly Hagan. In the second series of the show, Pattison began a turbulent on/off relationship with new cast member Ricci Guarnaccio. Pattison and former cast member Rebecca Walker were shown not to get on with each other, leading to constant conflict in the Geordie Shore house. Pattison's catchphrase "tash on" became new entry in online Collins dictionary. Her peculiar speech style became the object of much public attention: the use of words like ‘ostentatious’ and ‘euphoric’ "in a Geordie Shore context of expletives" has been recently described "as a ‘stretch’, a way of testing expressive limits, that is a form of catachresis." Pattison found herself in Cancun, Mexico during the third series where during filming, Guarnaccio proposed to her.

In the fifth series, Pattison calls her engagement off with Guarnaccio and ultimately ends the relationship. Guarnaccio later decided to leave the show following the break-up. In December 2013, she released her own fitness DVD entitled Vicky's 7 Day Slim. Before the beginning of the ninth series, she announced that it would be her last, making her final appearance during the series finale.

Legal issues 
In July 2013, during filming for the seventh series of Geordie Shore, Pattison was arrested after throwing a high heeled shoe at another club goer whom she incorrectly believed had thrown ice at her, and injuring a member of the venue's security staff who had intervened. She later pleaded guilty to two counts of assault, and was sentenced to 180 hours of unpaid community service and ordered to pay compensation to the two victims.

Personal life 
Since 2019, Pattison has been in a relationship with Ercan Ramadan. In  February 2022, the couple announced their engagement.

Television career
In 2014 and 2015, Pattison starred in the MTV reality television show Ex on the Beach. Pattison has appeared and made guest appearances on Big Brother's Bit on the Side, This Morning, Safeword, Celebrity Dinner Date, Murder in Successville,  Most Annoying People 2011, TV's 50 Greatest Magic Tricks, Most Shocking Celebrity Moments 2011, Virtually Famous, Ant and Dec's Saturday Night Takeaway, Celebrity Juice live special and Through the Keyhole.

Starting from June 2015, Pattison presented and starred in her own MTV show, Judge Geordie, in which she tries to sort out feuds and problems between families, friends and relationships.

Since mid-2015, Pattison has had her name on a weekly column in the magazine new!. Pattison released her autobiography entitled Nothing But The Truth in August 2014 and updated it in March 2016. She signed a deal to write two novels which were published in July (All That Glitters) and October 2015 (A Christmas Kiss).

On 2 July 2015, Pattison appeared on BBC Radio 1's Innuendo Bingo.

On 16 November 2015, it was confirmed that Pattison would be taking part in the fifteenth series of I'm a Celebrity...Get Me Out of Here!. Despite struggling to cope with the smell of the jungle, she went on to win the series.

Pattison was appearing as a regular panellist on ITV's lunchtime discussion show Loose Women from January 2016 before quitting in September after just nine months.  In January she also appeared in a 2-part Geordie Shore special speaking about her time on the show.

In June 2016, she became a team captain on the Channel 5 panel show It's Not Me, It's You, hosted by Eamonn Holmes. Also starting from September 2016, she has appeared in a new segment on This Morning regularly along with Ferne McCann where they go on a road trip together. In September 2016 it was announced that she would co-present I'm a Celebrity...Get Me Out of Here! NOW! from November 2016 alongside Joe Swash replacing Laura Whitmore, however, it was also later announced that the show would be retitled as I'm a Celebrity: Extra Camp and that Chris Ramsey and Stacey Solomon would be presenting alongside Pattison and Swash. In April 2017, Pattison announced that she would not be returning to present I'm a Celebrity: Extra Camp.

On 12 February 2018 (Day 17 of the season), Pattison became a contestant on the fourth season of the Australian version of I'm a Celebrity...Get Me Out of Here!. On 11 March 2018 (Day 44 of the season), she was evicted after spending 28 days in the jungle, finishing in fourth place.

On 16 October 2018, Pattison partnered with Dom Joly entered Channel 4's Celebrity Hunted which sees them going "on the run" as "fugitives". She along with the other celebrities donated their fee to Stand up To Cancer.

Filmography

References

External links
 
 

1987 births
Alumni of Liverpool John Moores University
Living people
People from Newcastle upon Tyne
English television personalities
English television presenters
English female models
Geordie Shore
I'm a Celebrity...Get Me Out of Here! (British TV series) winners
I'm a Celebrity...Get Me Out of Here! (Australian TV series) participants